Parvanachis obesa, common name the fat dovesnail, is a species of sea snail, a marine gastropod mollusk in the family Columbellidae, the dove snails.

Description

Distribution
This marine species occurs from 37°N to 35°S; 97.5°W to 36°W. Distribution: USA: Virginia, North Carolina, Georgia, Florida; Florida: East Florida, West Florida; USA: Louisiana, Texas; Mexico; Mexico: Veracruz, Campeche State, Yucatan State, Quintana Roo; Costa Rica, Panama, Colombia, Venezuela; Venezuela: Sucre, Isla Margarita; Bermuda, Jamaica; Virgin Islands: St. Croix; off French Guiana.; Surinam, Brazil; Brazil: Alagoas, Sao Paulo, Parana, Santa Catarina; Uruguay

References

 Altena, C.O. van Regteren. (1975). The marine Mollusca of Suriname (Dutch Guiana) Holocene and Recent Part III. Gastropoda and Cephalopoda. Zoologische Verhandelingen. 139: 1-104.
 Jensen, R. H. (1997). A Checklist and Bibliography of the Marine Molluscs of Bermuda. Unp. , 547 pp
 Pelorce J. (2017). Les Columbellidae (Gastropoda: Neogastropoda) de la Guyane française. Xenophora Taxonomy. 14: 4-21

External links
 Adams, C. B. (1845). Specierum novarum conchyliorum, in Jamaica repertorum, synopsis. Proceedings of the Boston Society of Natural History. 2: 1-17
  Adams, C. B. 1850. Description of supposed new species of marine shells which inhabit Jamaica. Contributions to Conchology, 4: 56–68, 109–123
 Reeve, L. A. (1858–1859). Monograph of the Genus Columbella. In: Conchologia Iconica, or, illustrations of the shells of molluscous animals, vol. 11, pl. 1-37 and unpaginated text. L. Reeve & Co., London.
 Ravenel, E. (1859). Description of three new species of univalves, recent and fossil. Proceedings of the Elliott Society of Natural History. 1: 280-282
  Rosenberg, G.; Moretzsohn, F.; García, E. F. (2009). Gastropoda (Mollusca) of the Gulf of Mexico, Pp. 579–699 in: Felder, D.L. and D.K. Camp (eds.), Gulf of Mexico–Origins, Waters, and Biota. Texas A&M Press, College Station, Texas

Columbellidae
Gastropods described in 1845